The Headies 2019 was the 13th edition of The Headies. It was held on October 19, 2019, at the Eko Convention Centre in Victoria Island, Lagos. Themed "Power of a Dream", the ceremony was hosted by Nigerian rapper Reminisce and actress/media personality Nancy Isime. After shortlisting thousands of entries submitted between January 2018 and June 2019, the organizers of the ceremony announced the nominees on 1 October 2019. Burna Boy set a record for the most nominations in one night with 10 nominations. Teni followed with 6 and Wizkid with 5. The ceremony featured performances from a number of artists, including Styl-Plus, Sunny Neji, Duncan Mighty, Teni and Victor AD. Teni won the most awards with 4. Rema won the Next Rated award, beating Fireboy DML, Joeboy, Lyta, Victor AD and Zlatan.

Performances
Styl-Plus
Sunny Neji
Zaki Adzay
Victor AD
Wurld
Teni
Duncan Mighty
Rema

Presenters 
Tobi Bakre – presented the award for Rookie of the Year
Wale Animashaun and Vivian – presented the award for Best Vocal Performance (Female)
Nancy Isime – presented the award for Best Vocal Performance (Male)
Nancy Isime – presented the award for Best Street Hop Artiste
The Organizers – presented the award for Best Recording of the Year
IK Ogbonna – presented the award for Best Rap Single
Osi Suave – presented the award for Best Alternative Song
Tony Tetuila – presented the award for Best Rap Album
Ruggedman – presented the award for Lyricist On The Roll
Bam Bam and Teddy A – presented the award for Best Collabo
Gbemi Olateru Olagbegi – presented the award for Best Performer
Kemi Smallz and DJ Sose – presented the award for Best R&B Single
Toke Makinwa and Ebuka Obi-Uchendu – presented the award for Best Pop Single
Dr SID and Ubi Franklin – presented the award for Best R&B/Pop Album
Mercy and Mike – presented the award for Viewer's Choice
Tacha, Tee-Y Mix and Venita – presented the award for Best Music Video 
Bovi and DJ Cuppy – presented the award for Hip Hop World Revelation of the Year
The Organizers – presented the award for Album of the Year
Dénola Grey – presented the award for Producer of the Year
Martin Gaone Mabutho – presented the Special Recognition Award
GAC Motor representatives – presented the Next Rated award
STAR Lager representative – presented the award for Song of the Year
Rita Daniels – presented the award for Artiste of the Year

Winners and nominees

References

2019 music awards
The Headies